Tibellus macellus is a spider found from Europe to Central Asia.

See also 
 List of Philodromidae species

References 

Philodromidae
Spiders of Europe
Spiders of Georgia (country)
Spiders of Asia
Spiders described in 1875